Jeremiah S. Bacon (September 16, 1858 – August 3, 1939) was an American politician. He served as a Democratic member of the Louisiana House of Representatives.

Bacon was born on a farm. He attended Minden Male Academy. In 1926, Bacon was elected to the Louisiana House of Representatives, winning a special election to complete J. Frank Colbert's leftover term. Bacon was succeeded by Eddie N. Payne in 1932.

Bacon died in August 1939, at the age of 80.

References 

1858 births
1939 deaths
Democratic Party members of the Louisiana House of Representatives
Businesspeople from Louisiana
People from Heflin, Louisiana
Burials in Louisiana
American justices of the peace
20th-century American politicians